A  list of films produced in Azerbaijan SSR ordered by year of release in the 1950s:

Films:1918-1990 see also List of Soviet films

1950s

External links
 Azerbaijani film at the Internet Movie Database
 Azerbaycan Kinosu

Lists of 1950s films
1950
Films